Polyvalente A.-J.-Savoie is a Francophone high school in Saint-Quentin, New Brunswick, Canada.

External links
 PAJS School Site

High schools in New Brunswick
1971 establishments in New Brunswick
Educational institutions established in 1971